Mohd Anis Faron bin Ahmad Arsidi or better known as Mohd Anis Faron (born 9 November 1982) is a Malaysian footballer who plays as a goalkeeper.

Career
Mohd Anis Faron started his professional career in Perak youth teams. He joined a Perak-based club Perak TKN FC in 2002 where he was installed as the first choice goalkeeper, before departing to Perlis in 2004. Later, he played for Sabah FA and Selangor FA, before joining  Johor FC in 2008. After released by Johor FC at the end of 2012, Anis played for Felda United FC in 2013, before returning to Johor to join Johor Darul Takzim II F.C. in April 2014. He played for the club until April 2015, when he was sacked following his court case, charged with verbally assaulting a police officer in Penang's City Stadium after a league match against Penang FA.

He has played for the Malaysia national under-23 football team.

References

External links
 Mimpi ngeri Anis Faron
 
 Profile at Johor Darul Ta'zim FC official website

1982 births
Living people
Malaysian people of Malay descent
People from Perak
Malaysian footballers
Selangor FA players
Sabah F.C. (Malaysia) players
Perlis FA players
Association football goalkeepers